Thomas Howard Kean Jr. (born September 5, 1968) is an American politician serving as the U.S. representative from New Jersey's 7th congressional district since 2023. He represented New Jersey's 21st legislative district in the New Jersey Senate from 2003 to 2022, serving as minority leader from 2008 to 2022. A member of the Republican Party, Kean is the son of former New Jersey governor Thomas Kean.

From 2001 to 2003, Kean was a member of the New Jersey General Assembly, representing the 21st legislative district, which includes parts of Union, Morris, Somerset, and Essex counties. In 2003, he was elected a New Jersey state senator representing the same district, and in January 2008 he became minority leader of the New Jersey Senate, serving in the position until his term ended in January 2022.

After Governor Chris Christie was reelected in 2013, Christie tried and failed to remove Kean as minority leader. Kean was frequently mentioned as a potential Republican candidate for governor in the 2017 New Jersey gubernatorial election, but did not seek the nomination. 

In a 2022 rematch, Kean was elected in New Jersey's 7th congressional district, defeating incumbent Democrat Tom Malinowski.

Early life 
Kean was born in Livingston, one of twin sons of Deborah (née Bye) and Thomas Kean, who went on to be twice elected governor of New Jersey, serving from 1982 to 1990; the couple also had a daughter. Thomas Jr. grew up on the family's estate in Livingston. His grandfather is Robert Kean, a former congressman from New Jersey. His great-grandfather Hamilton Fish Kean and great-great-uncle John Kean were both U.S. senators. His grandmother's family are descendants of Peter Stuyvesant, the Dutch colonial governor of New Amsterdam (now known as New York). His great-grandmother Katharine Winthrop was a direct descendant of John Winthrop, the first governor of the Massachusetts Bay Colony. He is also a direct descendant of Thomas Dudley, governor of the Massachusetts Bay Colony and a signer of Harvard College's charter. His second great-great-uncle was Hamilton Fish, a U.S. senator, governor of New York, and U.S. Secretary of State. He is also a relative of William Livingston, the first governor of New Jersey.

Kean graduated from the Pingry School in Basking Ridge. He is also a graduate of Dartmouth College and holds a Master of Arts in Law and Diplomacy from the Fletcher School of Law and Diplomacy at Tufts University, where he completed doctoral studies ABD in international relations. At Dartmouth, he was a member of the Psi Upsilon fraternity. He was an aide to former Congressman Bob Franks and a special assistant at the United States Environmental Protection Agency in the George H. W. Bush administration. He has also been a volunteer firefighter and a volunteer emergency medical technician. Kean resides in Westfield, with his wife, Rhonda, and their two daughters.

New Jersey Assembly 
Kean was appointed to the General Assembly, the lower house of the New Jersey Legislature, in April 2001, to serve out the unexpired term of Alan Augustine, who had resigned on March 21, 2001, for health reasons. He was elected to a full term in the Assembly in November 2001.  In the Assembly, he chaired the Republican Policy Committee and served as vice chair of the State Government Committee.

New Jersey Senate

Tenure

In March 2003, Kean was appointed to the New Jersey Senate to serve out the unexpired term of Rich Bagger, and won election to that Senate seat in November 2003. In 2004, he was elected Senate Minority Whip, a position he held until 2007. He served in the Senate on the Health, Human Services and Senior Citizens Committee. In the state legislature, Kean was a proponent of ethics reform in New Jersey government. He was the original sponsor of legislation banning pay to play practices in New Jersey. He sponsored legislation to streamline government, promote education, protect the environment, and lower property taxes. Kean was one of 24 elected officials chosen as an Aspen Rodel Fellow in Public Service.

In 2002, Kean was named one of 40 state leaders nationwide to be recognized as a Toll Fellow by the Council of State Governments for high achievement and service to state government.

In 2005, the New Jersey Conference of Mayors named Kean a Legislative Leader. He also received, for the second year in a row, the Amerigroup Foundation's Champion for Children award for his advocacy on behalf of children's health issues. He was named Legislator of the year by the Fireman's Benevolent Association and received a 100% voting rating from the National Federation of Independent Business.

Kean was one of six Republicans in the state senate to vote for a 2019 appropriations bill that passed 31 to 6.

Committees 
Commerce
Higher Education
Legislative Oversight
Legislative Services Commission

2006 U.S. Senate Campaign 

Kean was the Republican nominee for the United States Senate seat vacated by former U.S. senator and former governor of New Jersey Jon Corzine, a seat now filled by Corzine's designated replacement, Bob Menendez. Kean won the June 6, 2006, primary against John P. Ginty by a 3–1 margin. He lost the general election to Menendez, 53.3% to 44.3%. The race was the narrowest victory for an incumbent Democrat in the U.S. in an election that saw Democrats retake control of the Senate as part of a nationwide backlash against the Bush administration. Kean was endorsed by The Courier-Post, The Press of Atlantic City, and Asbury Park Press.

U.S House of Representatives

Elections

2000 

Kean sought the Republican nomination for New Jersey's 7th congressional district, but lost the primary to Mike Ferguson by about 4,000 votes, finishing second in a field of four candidates.

2020 

On April 16, 2019, Kean announced that he was running for New Jersey's 7th congressional district in 2020, challenging first-term Democratic incumbent Tom Malinowski. In the first quarter of 2019, Kean nearly matched Malinowski's fundraising total of over $500,000. In August 2019, Kean was endorsed by House Minority Leader Kevin McCarthy. Kean won the Republican primary over token opposition, and narrowly lost to Malinowski in the general election. It was the closest House race in New Jersey and one of the closest in the country; due to the close margin and slow counting of mail-in and provisional ballots, the outcome remained in doubt until nearly two weeks after the election.

2022 

Kean announced in February 2021 that he would not seek reelection to the State Senate and quickly became a top recruit for Republicans to run for New Jersey's 7th congressional district. Malinowski was under scrutiny after his failure to disclose more than 100 stock trades became a national news story and led to a complaint filed with the House Ethics Committee. David Wasserman, the U.S. House editor of the nonpartisan Cook Political Report, suggested that Democrats could redraw the 7th district as more Republican in exchange for making the 11th district and 5th district more solidly Democratic. Kean formally announced his campaign on July 14, 2021, joined by U.S. House Minority Leader Kevin McCarthy. He won the Republican primary in June 2022 and the general election with 51.8% (156,414 votes) to Malinowski's 48.2% (145,253 votes).

Caucus memberships 

 Republican Main Street Partnership
 Problem Solvers Caucus

Personal life 
Kean is an Episcopalian.

Political views 
Kean is a member of the Republican Main Street Partnership, and joined the Problem Solvers Caucus, a centrist congressional caucus in the House of Representatives. The caucus has led Kean to cooperate with other members of Congress from New Jersey, such as Josh Gottheimer and Mikie Sherrill. Kean said he joined the caucus to assure constituents that he remains committed to "working across the aisle" of the political spectrum. Kean is a moderate Republican, though detractors have said he could have done more to distance himself from the politics of President Trump.

Ukraine
Kean introduced a House Resolution on  March 15, recognizing the sovereignty of Ukraine and the "unbreakable spirit of the people of Ukraine". The resolution reaffirms strong support for continued United States assistance to Ukraine, urges increased assistance to Ukraine, and calls on allies and partners in Europe to increase national defense spending in order to bolster trans-Atlantic security. “This war has come at a heavy cost as thousands of Ukrainians have given their lives defending democracy, sovereignty, and freedom. The Ukrainian people have proven their unbreakable spirit and fierce perseverance in their mission. When Russia’s invasion began, many said that Kyiv would fall within weeks, maybe even days. Today, Kyiv stands strong, and we will continue to stand with the brave men and women on the frontlines, as their fight for freedom continues,” said Kean.

Electoral history

United States House of Representatives

New Jersey Senate

New Jersey Assembly

United States Senate

References

External links
 Congressman Thomas Kean Jr. official U.S. House website
Kean Jr. for Congress campaign website

 Senator Thomas H. Kean Jr. legislative web page, New Jersey Legislature
 New Jersey Legislature financial disclosure forms
 2015 2014 2013 2012 2011 2010 2009 2008 2007 2006 2005 2004
 District 21 Candidates website Kean (Senate), Bramnick & Munoz (Assembly).
 "The New Jersey X Factor", Mother Jones magazine, October 30, 2006.

|-

|-

|-

|-

|-

|-

1968 births
21st-century American politicians
American Episcopalians
Candidates in the 2006 United States elections
Candidates in the 2020 United States elections
Dartmouth College alumni
Episcopalians from New Jersey
Thomas Jr.
Living people
Livingston family
Republican Party members of the New Jersey General Assembly
Republican Party members of the United States House of Representatives from New Jersey
Republican Party New Jersey state senators
People from Livingston, New Jersey
People from Westfield, New Jersey
Politicians from Union County, New Jersey
Pingry School alumni
Psi Upsilon
Schuyler family
Winthrop family